Anne Jackson (September 3, 1925 – April 12, 2016) was an American actress of stage, screen, and television. She was the wife of actor Eli Wallach, with whom she often co-starred. In 1956, she was nominated for the Tony Award for Best Featured Actress in a Play for her performance in Paddy Chayefsky's Middle of the Night. In 1963, she won an Obie Award for Best Actress for her performance in two Off-Broadway plays, The Typists and The Tiger.

Life and career
Jackson was born in Millvale, Pennsylvania in 1925, the daughter of Stella Germaine (née Murray) and John Ivan Jackson, a barber. She was the youngest of three children, after Catherine, eight years older, and Beatrice, three years older. Her year of birth had been misreported for years as 1926, the year Jackson gave in a 1962 interview.
Jackson's mother was of Irish Catholic descent and her father, whose original name was Ivan Jakšeković, had emigrated from Croatia (then part of Austria-Hungary) in 1918. Her family moved to Brooklyn, New York when she was eight years old. She attended Franklin K. Lane High School. In New York, Jackson trained at the Neighborhood Playhouse and the Actors Studio. She made her Broadway debut in 1945. Her theater credits included Summer and Smoke, Arms and the Man, Luv, The Waltz of the Toreadors, Mr. Peters' Connections and Lost in Yonkers.

Jackson's screen credits include The Tiger Makes Out, The Secret Life of an American Wife, How to Save a Marriage and Ruin Your Life, Lovers and Other Strangers, Dirty Dingus Magee, Folks!, and The Shining. Her many television appearances include Armstrong Circle Theatre, Academy Theatre, The Philco Television Playhouse, Studio One, The Untouchables, The Defenders, multiple appearances, 
as different, similar, characters on Gunsmoke, Marcus Welby, M.D., Rhoda, The Facts of Life , Highway to Heaven, Law & Order, and ER. She narrated Stellaluna on an episode of the PBS series Reading Rainbow''.

In March 2017, the Harry Ransom Center announced the acquisition of Anne Jackson's archive along with her husband's. It opened for research in 2018.

Personal life

Jackson was married to actor Eli Wallach, with whom she acted frequently, from March 5, 1948, until his death on June 24, 2014. They had three children, Peter, Katherine, and Roberta. Her marriage to Wallach was one of the longest and most successful in the industry. She later taught at the HB Studio in Manhattan, and continued to act in cameo roles.

Death
Jackson died at her home in Manhattan on April 12, 2016, aged 90.

Filmography

References

External links
 
 
 Anne Jackson and Eli Wallach Papers at the Harry Ransom Center
 Anne Jackson interviews at the University of Wisconsin's Actors Studio audio collection

1925 births
2016 deaths
People from Millvale, Pennsylvania
American people of Irish descent
American people of Croatian descent
20th-century American actresses
21st-century American actresses
Actresses from Pennsylvania
Actresses from New York City
American film actresses
American stage actresses
American television actresses
Obie Award recipients